The 2010 Rallye Sanremo (52º Rallye Sanremo), was the 10th round of the 2010 Intercontinental Rally Challenge (IRC) season and was also a round of the Italian Rally Championship. The eleven stage asphalt rally took place on 23–25 September 2010. The longest stage of the rally, Ronde, was run in darkness. All other stages were run in daylight.

Introduction
The rally base was located along the sea front and the old railway station in the heart of the town of Sanremo. A record breaking entry of 30 S2000 cars contested the last all-asphalt IRC event of the year. In addition to the top six runners in the IRC, Proton entered three-time Sanremo winner Gilles Panizzi to partner alongside Niall McShea.

Results
Paolo Andreucci became the seventh victor of an IRC rally in 2010, after holding off Juho Hänninen by just 4.4 seconds, with Freddy Loix just edging out Kris Meeke for the final podium position with a stage-winning time on the final stage. Meeke had held the lead of the rally for the first three of the rally's eleven stages before Andreucci claimed the rally lead through the Apricale test. Abarth's Giandomenico Basso led the rally at the end of day one, setting a time some fifteen seconds quicker than his rivals on the night-time Ronde test of 44 kilometres. Basso would eventually slip to seventh in the final classification. Hänninen cut into Andreucci's lead on day two, with the championship leader falling narrowly short of Andreucci, who claimed his first victory in the IRC. Hänninen's second place allowed him to advance two points in the championship standings due to an improvement on dropped scores, while rival Jan Kopecký could do no better than sixth, and thus failing to improve his points total.

Overall

Special stages

References

External links 
 The official website for the rally
 The official website of the Intercontinental Rally Challenge

Sanremo
Sanremo Rally
Sanremo Rally